Martinez Library is a historic library located in downtown Martinez, California that is part of the Contra Costa County Library system.

History
Starting in the Fall of 1883, the Esse Quam Videre Club organized to establish a free reading room.

Two years later in 1885 the Martinez Free Reading Room and Library Association was formed, operating out of a building owned by Dr. John Strentzel who charged nothing to the Association. Reading at the location was free, but the Association charged dues of 25 cents a month for the privilege to borrow books.

After more than 40 years at that location, voters passed a  bond issue to fund a new library building. The new building was designed in an Art Deco style and completed in 1941.

In November 2008 Measure H was passed narrowly by voters in the city of Martinez to renovate and expand the library. The bond specified a designated children's area, youth recreational opportunities, and improving disabled access.

The  renovation work started in November 2010 and the library continued operating for 25 hours per week in a temporary location in the old train depot near Martinez station. The library continued operating in the interim Depot Library until  when it closed to transition back to the renovated building.

The Martinez Library held the Grand Reopening on Saturday August 20, 2011 with over 1000 visitors entering the library that day. New self-service stations were installed along with new furniture and additional computers.

Modern
The Martinez Library offers a variety of activities and resources for their patrons. Activities vary from story time and lego workshops for children to book clubs for adults.

The library actively seeks to expose patrons to other cultures and has been hosting Chinese Lunar New Year celebration since . Lion dance and other Chinese cultural traditions have been showcased along with crafts.

Lunches were provided to children and teens three days a week in the summer as part of the California Summer Meal Coalition. Many of the families that visited for the program had not been to the library before and had been unaware of the services offered beyond book lending. Library usage increased with the implementation of the program.

Gallery

See also

GoLibrary
National Register of Historic Places listings in Contra Costa County, California

References

External links

National Register of Historic Places in Contra Costa County, California
Martinez, California
Art Deco architecture in California
Library buildings completed in 1941
Link+ libraries
1941 establishments in California